Auriculastra is a genus of air-breathing land snails, terrestrial gastropod mollusks in the family Ellobiidae, the salt marsh snails.

Species
Species in the genus Auriculastra include:
 Auriculastra acuta Connolly, 1922
 Auriculastra aquensis (Tournouër, 1872) †
 Auriculastra badeniensis Kókay, 2006 †
 Auriculastra biplicata (Grateloup, 1828) †
 Auriculastra brachyspira (Möllendorff, 1894)
 Auriculastra dumasi (Cossmann, 1895) †
 Auriculastra duplicata (L. Pfeiffer, 1854)
 Auriculastra gassiesi (Morelet, 1882)
 Auriculastra hyalina (Morelet, 1883)
 Auriculastra incrassata (H. Adams & A. Adams, 1854)
 Auriculastra oparica (H. Adams & A. Adams, 1854)
 Auriculastra ovata (Briart & Cornet, 1887) †
 Auriculastra radiolata (Morelet, 1860)
 Auriculastra saccata (L. Pfeiffer, 1856)
 Auriculastra semiplicata (H. Adams & A. Adams, 1854)
 Auriculastra siamensis (Brandt, 1974)
 Auriculastra subula (Quoy & Gaimard, 1832)
Species brought into synonymy
 Auriculastra catonis (Melvill & Ponsonby, 1899): synonym of Auriculastra radiolata (Morelet, 1860) (junior synonym)
 Auriculastra nana Haas, 1950: synonym of Microtralia ovulum (Pfeiffer, 1840)
 Auriculastra nevillei (Morelet, 1882): synonym of Auriculastra radiolata (Morelet, 1860) (junior synonym)

References

 Nomenclator Zoologicus info
 Smith B.J. (1992). Non-marine Mollusca. In: Houston W.W.K. (ed.) Zoological Catalogue of Australia, volume 8. xii + 405 pp.
 Kókay, J. (2006). Nonmarine mollusc fauna from the Lower and Middle Miocene, Bakony Mts., W Hungary. Geologica Hungarica, Series Palaeontologica. 56, 1-196.

External links
 Martens E. von. (1880). Mollusken. Pp. 179-353, pl. 19-22 In K. Moebius, F. Richters & E. von Martens, Beiträge zur Meeresfauna der Insel Mauritius und der Seychellen. Berlin: Gutmann
 Quadras, J. F.; Möllendorff, O. F. von. (1895). Diagnoses specierum novarum ex insulis Philippinis. Nachrichtsblatt der Deutschen Malakozoologischen Gesellschaft. 27: 73–88, 105–121, 137–149

Ellobiidae
Gastropod genera